Vinicius James Williams (February 29, 1904 – September 2, 1968) was an American Negro league catcher between 1928 and 1939.

A native of Atlanta, Georgia, Williams attended Morehouse College. He made his Negro leagues debut in 1928 with the Nashville Elite Giants. With the exception of a one-year stint with the Cleveland Cubs in 1931, Williams played for the Elite Giants through 1937, as the team's home moved from Nashville to Columbus and Washington. He joined the Atlanta Black Crackers as player-manager in 1938, was relieved of his managerial duties mid-season, and remained with that club when it moved to Indianapolis in 1939. Williams married the mother of baseball great Donn Clendenon, and was instrumental in Clendenon's early baseball development. Williams died in Atlanta in 1968 at age 64.

References

External links
 and Baseball-Reference Black Baseball stats and Seamheads
  and Seamheads

1904 births
1968 deaths
Atlanta Black Crackers players
Cleveland Cubs players
Columbus Elite Giants players
Nashville Elite Giants players
Negro league baseball managers
Washington Elite Giants players
20th-century African-American sportspeople
Baseball catchers